Katia Zuccarelli (born 1992), known professionally as Katia, is a Canadian singer-songwriter. Zuccarelli has been featured on YTV series Life with Boys,  CTV's Instant Star Season 4 Soundtrack, and as a background vocalist on Selena Gomez's Kiss & Tell. In 2015 Zuccarelli was a top 6 finalist in the Canadian Country Music Association Discovery Program and signed a publishing and development deal with Ole.

Discography

Singles

Albums

References 

Living people
Canadian people of Italian descent
Canadian singer-songwriters
Musicians from Toronto
Canadian women pop singers
1992 births
Canadian women singer-songwriters
21st-century Canadian women singers